Shila is a 1982 Indian Malayalam film, directed by Augustine Prakash.  The film has musical score by A. T. Ummer.

Cast

Soundtrack
The music was composed by A. T. Ummer and the lyrics were written by Dr. Pavithran.

References

External links
 

1982 films
1980s Malayalam-language films